Felix railway station is located in the community of Felix, Ontario, Canada. This station is in use by Via Rail. Transcontinental Canadian trains stop there.

External links
 Felix railway station

Via Rail stations in Ontario
Railway stations in Sudbury District
Canadian Northern Railway stations in Ontario